The Company's Garden is the oldest garden in South Africa, a park and heritage site located in central Cape Town. The garden was originally created in the 1650s by the region's first European settlers and provided fertile ground to grow fresh produce to replenish ships rounding the Cape. It is watered from the Molteno Dam, which uses water from the springs on the lower slopes of Table Mountain.

History

The Dutch East India Company established the garden in Cape Town for the purpose of providing fresh vegetables to the settlement as well as passing ships. Master gardener and free burgher Hendrik Boom prepared the first ground for sowing of seed on 29 April 1652. The settlers sowed different kinds of seeds and kept record thereof each day. Through trial and error they managed to compile a calendar which they used for the sowing and harvesting throughout the year. At first they grew salad herbs, peas, large beans, radish, beet, spinach, wheat, cabbage, asparagus and turnips among others. They caught fish, trapped wild animals and traded with the Khoisan for cattle and sheep with copper and tobacco. By 1653 the garden allowed the settlers to become self sustainable throughout the year. As the settlement grew, additional farming land was prepared at Rondebosch in 1656. By 1658 nearly every garden plant of Europe and India was already cultivated in the garden, though potatoes and maize were not yet introduced.

Before 1680 the Company's Garden was mainly used to produce vegetables, until Simon van der Stel laid out the ground afresh for the purpose of beautifying the garden. During the 17th century the garden was made famous by writers of various nationalities, claiming that visitors who had seen the most celebrated gardens of Europe and India were agreed that nowhere else in the world was so great a variety of trees and shrubs of vegetables and flowers to be met with together. The garden superintendent and Botanist Hendrik Bernard Oldenland compiled a herbarium which was sent to the Netherlands after his sudden death. In 1770 the 'Catalogue of Plants' was found in possession of Professor Burmann of Amsterdam.

Features in the park

 The oldest cultivated pear tree in South Africa (circa 1652)
 A rose garden designed and built in 1929
 A well stocked fish pond
 Dellville Wood Memorial Garden, which commemorates the World War I Battle of Delville Wood in France, in which a predominantly South African force of more than 3,000 soldiers was reduced to 755 survivors by German forces
 An aviary
 Restaurant – The Company's Garden Restaurant
 Botanically and historically valuable trees
 Local arts and crafts along the avenue
 Lawns and benches
 A herb and succulent garden
 Historic statues
 Iziko South African Museum and Iziko National Gallery
 Various wild, feral and semi-domesticated species of birds and animals, including the African turtle dove, laughing dove, rock dove, Egyptian goose and squirrels.

Monuments

Nearby places of interest

 Parliament and Tuynhuys are adjacent to the park
 National Library of South Africa
 St George's Cathedral
 Slave Lodge
 Centre for the Book
 Gardens Shul, South African Jewish Museum 
 Cape Town Holocaust Centre
 Hiddingh Campus, University of Cape Town
 Mount Nelson Hotel

Events

The Company's Garden hosts the annual Cape Town Festival.
Cape Peninsula University of Technology usually has the annual walking/city tour that concludes at the garden.

See also

 Cecil John Rhodes Statue
 Artillery Memorial, Cape Town
 Iziko South African Museum
 South African National Gallery
 National Library of South Africa
 Japanese Lantern Monument

References

External links

Cape Town Festival
SA Jewish Museum
Cape Town Parks
 

Parks in Cape Town
History of Cape Town
Historic sites in South Africa
South African heritage sites
Tourist attractions in Cape Town